San Francisco School of Digital Filmmaking, also known as the San Francisco Film School and FilmschoolSF, is a private, for-profit  vocational film school in San Francisco, California. The school was founded by Stephen Kopels and Jeremiah Birnbaum in 2005 and works in conjunction with Fog City Productions, a local independent production company, to teach students the art and craft of filmmaking. The programs include workshops and a certificate program.

Feature films created in school
 Presque Isle
 Around June
 Moonlight Sonata
 Trattoria
 Two Mothers
 TORN

References

External links

Universities and colleges in San Francisco
Cinema of the San Francisco Bay Area